Dominika Selucká (born 13 December 1987) is a Czech handballer player for DHC Slavia Prague and the Czech national team.

References

1987 births
Living people
Czech female handball players